Melcombe Regis was a station on the Portland Branch Railway in the English county of Dorset. Opened in April 1909, it was sited at the north end of the bridge over Radipole Lake. The station was built to enable Portland branch passengers to go to Weymouth without the need for the branch train to reverse to enter Weymouth railway station. The branch junction was to the north of Weymouth station and faced Dorchester. The station was closed officially, along with the branch, on 3 March 1952. However, the station continued to be used for overflow from the adjacent Weymouth station, particularly on summer Saturdays: regularly until 12 September 1959 and irregularly for a while after that.

Operated by the Great Western Railway, the station was placed in the Western Region when the railways were nationalised in 1948.

Goods trains continued to pass the site on their way to the Admiralty sites on Portland until 1965.

The site today

The last remains were removed in 2000 and the site is now under the relief road at the north end of Swannery Bridge near a car park.

Further reading

References
 Subterranean Britannica
 British Railway Journal, Volume 8 Number 69. 
 Station on navigable O.S. map located near Weymouth main station north of Radipole Lake

Buildings and structures in Weymouth, Dorset
Disused railway stations in Dorset
Former Weymouth and Portland Railway stations
Railway stations in Great Britain opened in 1909
Railway stations in Great Britain closed in 1952
History of Weymouth, Dorset